Vanesa Furlanetto (born 19 February 1987) is an Argentine former tennis player.

In her career, she won 13 singles titles and 13 doubles titles on the ITF Women's Circuit. On 18 November 2013, she reached her best singles ranking of world No. 312. On 26 May 2014, she peaked at No. 248 in the doubles rankings.

Partnering Amandine Hesse, Furlanetto won her first $50k tournament at Contrexéville, defeating Ana Konjuh and Silvia Njirić in the final.

In July 2015, she played her last match on the pro circuit.

ITF Circuit finals

Singles: 23 (13 titles, 10 runner-ups)

Doubles: 27 (13 titles, 14 runner-ups)

External links
 
 

1987 births
Living people
Argentine female tennis players
21st-century Argentine women